Invisible Superman (Chinese: 隱形超人, Hanyu Pinyin: Yǐnxíng Chāorén) is Amber Kuo's first Chinese language album.

Track listing
 I Remember
 I Need You
 Shopping Tomorrow / Shopping 明天
 Quickly ( Kuai Yi Dian ) / 快一點
 Invisible Superman / 隱形超人
 Honestly Thinking About You / 誠實地想你
 Qian Chuai De Bei Ying / 欠踹的背影		
 Wo De Wei Lai Shi / 我的未來式	
 Zou Lu Fei Xing / 走路飛行 				
 Ai Qing Ding Ge / 愛情定格

MV 
 I Remember
 I Need You
 Quickly / 快一點
 Invisible Superman / 隱形超人
 Thinking About You in the Truth / 誠實地想你
 Love's Freeze-Frame / 愛情定格

External links 
Warner Music Online
ezPeer+
KKBOX
Books.com

2007 debut albums
Amber Kuo albums
Warner Music Taiwan albums